Wenchang railway station is a railway station on the Hainan eastern ring high-speed railway located in Hainan, China.

Railway stations in Hainan